The Balearic green toad (Bufotes balearicus) is a toad belonging to the true toad family, Bufonidae, from Italy and islands in the western Mediterranean Sea. It is mostly a lowland species, but can be found as high as  asl in central Italy.

Distribution
In spite of the name, this species is native to Italy (where it is present on all territories except for the extreme north-east, south-east and south-west) and Corsica. It was probably introduced to the Balearic Islands in prehistoric times, where it is common but declining. Its formerly extended into Switzerland and there have been (so far) unsuccessful reintroduction attempts in that country. Its range meets that of the similar and closely related European green toad (B. viridis) in far northeastern Italy and that of the Sicilian green toad (B. boulengeri siculus) in easternmost Sicily.

Taxonomy and appearance

Once considered the same as the European green toad, molecular genetic data now firmly support its status as a separate species. There is some hybridization where their ranges come into contact; hybridization with the Sicilian green toad is extremely limited. The three species are very similar, but the Balearic green toad has paratoid glands with brownish or reddish spots.

References

External links

Bufotes
Amphibians of Europe
Articles containing video clips
Amphibians described in 1880